The chestnut-capped laughingthrush (Pterorhinus mitratus), also known as the spectacled laughingthrush, is a species of bird in the family Leiothrichidae.
It is found in Sumatra (Indonesia) and the Thai-Malay Peninsula.
Its natural habitats are subtropical or tropical moist lowland forests and subtropical or tropical moist montane forests.  The chestnut-hooded laughingthrush was previously considered a subspecies.

The chestnut-capped laughingthrush was formerly placed in the genus Garrulax but following the publication of a comprehensive molecular phylogenetic study in 2018, it was moved to the resurrected genus Pterorhinus.

References

External links

 Chestnut-capped laughingthrush video on the Internet Bird Collection

chestnut-capped laughingthrush
Birds of the Malay Peninsula
Birds of Sumatra
chestnut-capped laughingthrush
Taxonomy articles created by Polbot
Taxa named by Salomon Müller
Taxobox binomials not recognized by IUCN